Alexander Grimmond Davie (born 10 June 1945) is a Scottish former footballer, who played as goalkeeper. Davie spent most of his career with Dundee United and represented Scotland at under-23 level and New Zealand at senior level.

In 1967, Ted Bates tried to sign Davie for £15,000 but the offer was rejected. He eventually joined Southampton in May 1970 (for a fee of £12,500) as cover for Eric Martin, but only made one appearance for the Saints on 20 February 1971 in a 5–1 defeat at Manchester United. Four of Manchester United's goals were scored by Alan Gowling. He returned to his home town club in May 1972 where he enjoyed several good seasons before emigrating to New Zealand.

Davie played for the All Whites, making his debut in a 3–0 win over Fiji on 1 July 1979 and ended his international playing career with 11 A-international caps to his credit. He was involved at various levels with the New Zealand ladies' football team – the Football Ferns – until April 2003. Davie was also manager at North Shore United shortly after emigrating.

Honours
Dundee United
Scottish Cup runner-up: 1974

See also
List of sportspeople who competed for more than one nation

References

1945 births
Living people
Footballers from Dundee
Scottish footballers
New Zealand association footballers
Dundee United F.C. players
Luton Town F.C. players
Southampton F.C. players
Scottish football managers
Scottish expatriate football managers
New Zealand international footballers
Association football goalkeepers
Napier City Rovers FC players
Scotland under-23 international footballers
Scottish emigrants to New Zealand
Dallas Tornado players
United Soccer Association players
Scottish expatriate sportspeople in the United States
Expatriate soccer players in the United States
Scottish expatriate footballers
New Zealand women's national football team managers